Shelderton is a hamlet in south Shropshire, England. It is located just southeast of the village of Clungunford and is part of that village's civil parish.

It was a medieval township and belonged to Munslow hundred.

The border with Herefordshire is nearby to the south. The small hamlet of Little Common is near to Shelderton, on the B4367 road, and is connected with Shelderton by a footpath. Also on the B4367, near to where the Leintwardine lane from Shelderton meets the B4367, is a Grade II Listed house called The Lynches.

The nearest market towns are Craven Arms and Ludlow.

A Roman road runs through Shelderton, on its way between the Roman fort and settlement at Leintwardine and the city at Wroxeter.

There is a Royal Mail post box in the hamlet.

References

External links

Hamlets in Shropshire